Tarentola protogigas is a species of geckos in the family Phyllodactylidae. The species is endemic to Cape Verde, where it is found on the islands Fogo, Brava and the smaller Ilhéus Secos The species was named by Ulrich Joger in 1984.

Taxonomy
Previously a subspecies Tarentola rudis protogigas, it was elevated to species status in 2012. Also, Tarentola rudis hartogi was placed under this species as Tarentola protogigas hartogi.

Subspecies
The following subspecies are recognised:
Tarentola protogigas hartogi Joger, 1993 - Brava and Ilhéus Secos
Tarentola protogigas protogigas Joger, 1984 - Fogo

References

protogigas
Geckos of Africa
Endemic vertebrates of Cape Verde
Fauna of Fogo, Cape Verde
Fauna of Brava, Cape Verde
Reptiles described in 1984
Taxa named by Ulrich Joger